Fredericksburg Independent School District is a public school district based in Fredericksburg, Texas (USA).

In addition to Fredericksburg, the district serves the unincorporated communities of Stonewall, Luckenbach, Willow City, and Albert. Located in Gillespie County, small portions of the district extend into Blanco and Kendall counties.

In 2009, the school district was rated "academically acceptable" by the Texas Education Agency.

Schools 
 Fredericksburg High (Grades 9-12)
 1999-2000 National Blue Ribbon School
 Fredericksburg Middle (Grades 6-8)
 Fredericksburg Elementary (Grades 1-5)
 Fredericksburg Primary (Grades PK-K)
 Stonewall Elementary (Grades K-5)

See also
Cave Creek School
Cherry Spring School
Crabapple School
Lower South Grape Creek School
Luckenbach School
 Morris Ranch Schoolhouse
Rheingold School
Willow City School
Wrede School

References

External links 
 Fredericksburg ISD

School districts in Blanco County, Texas
School districts in Gillespie County, Texas
School districts in Kendall County, Texas